Rutpela is a genus of beetles of flower longhorns belonging to the family Cerambycidae, subfamily Lepturinae.

Species
Species within this genus include:
 Rutpela inermis (Daniel K. & Daniel J., 1898)
 Rutpela maculata (Poda, 1761)

References

Lepturinae